Masaki Kobayashi was a Japanese film director, screenwriter and producer who has directed twenty films in a career spanning 33 years. He is best known for The Human Condition Trilogy, the Academy Award–nominated horror film Kwaidan and the jidaigeki films Harakiri and Samurai Rebellion.

List of feature films

As assistant director

Citations 

 
Kobayashi